Sulochana M. Modi was an Indian politician. She was the 25th Mayor of Bombay and the first woman mayor. She was awarded the Padma Shri in 1973.

References

Mayors of Mumbai
Indian National Congress politicians
Year of birth missing
Year of death missing